Melaica Tuinfort (born 11 March 1990) is a Dutch Paralympic powerlifter. She won the bronze medal in the women's +86 kg event at the 2016 Summer Paralympics held in Rio de Janeiro, Brazil.

At the 2014 IPC Powerlifting World Championships held in Dubai, United Arab Emirates she won the bronze medal in the women's +86 kg event.

References

External links 
 

Living people
1990 births
Place of birth missing (living people)
Dutch powerlifters
Powerlifters at the 2016 Summer Paralympics
Medalists at the 2016 Summer Paralympics
Paralympic bronze medalists for the Netherlands
Female powerlifters
Paralympic medalists in powerlifting